Daren is a settlement in Trefeurig, Ceredigion, Wales.

Daren may also refer to:

 Daren, Taitung, Taiwan
 Daren (given name), a masculine given name of uncertain etymological origins

See also
 Dairen, Liaoning province, China
 Darien (disambiguation)
 Darin (disambiguation)